The following radio stations broadcast on AM frequency 650 kHz: 650 AM is a United States clear-channel frequency. WSM Nashville and KENI Anchorage share Class A status of 650 kHz.

Argentina
 Belgrano in Buenos Aires

Bolivia
 CP 263 in El Alto

Canada

Colombia
 HJKH in Bogotá

Cuba
 CMFA in Cienfuegos
 CMJA in Santiago de Cuba

Dominican Republic
 HIAD in Santo Domingo

Denmark

Greenland
 OZM in Godhavn

Honduras
 HRLK in Comayagua
 HRVW in San Pedro Sula

Mexico
 XECSBK-AM in Puerto Vallarta, Jalisco
 XEPX-AM in El Vigía/Puerto Ángel, Oaxaca
 XEVG-AM in Mérida, Yucatán

Nicaragua
 YNWW in Asese

Panama
 HOS 22 in Panama City

United States
Stations in bold are clear-channel stations.

Uruguay
 CX6 Clásica in Montevideo

Venezuela
 YVLH in Maracay

External links

 FCC list of radio stations on 650 kHz

References

Lists of radio stations by frequency